The Hero of the Hour is a 1917 American silent Western film directed by Raymond Wells. It stars Jack Mulhall, Wadsworth Harris, and Fritzi Ridgeway.

Cast
 Jack Mulhall as Billy Brooks
 Wadsworth Harris as Brooks, Sr.
 Fritzi Ridgeway as Mildred
 Eugene Owen as Nebeker
 Fred Burns as Foreman
 Millard K. Wilson as The Mexican
 Grace McLean as Juanita
 Noble Johnson as the Native American

References

External links
 

1917 films
1917 Western (genre) films
American black-and-white films
Universal Pictures films
Silent American Western (genre) films
1910s American films